Moldova participated at the 2017 Summer Universiade which was held in Taipei, Taiwan.

Moldova sent a delegation consisting of  13 competitors for the event competing in 5 sporting events. Moldova claimed a bronze medal in the multi-sport event.

Participants

Medalists

References 

2017 in Moldovan sport
Nations at the 2017 Summer Universiade